Červená Řečice is a town in Pelhřimov District in the Vysočina Region of the Czech Republic. It has about 1,000 inhabitants. The historic town centre is well preserved and is protected by law as an urban monument zone.

Administrative parts
Villages of Milotičky, Popelištná, Těchoraz and Zmišovice are administrative parts of Červená Řečice.

Etymology
The name řečice is derived from řeka (i.e. "river"), meaning "small river". In the 14th century it was called Biskupská Řečice ("Bishop's Řečice"), since 1559 it has been named Červená Řečice ("Red Řečice").

Geography
It lies in the Křemešník Highlands. It lies on the right banks of the Trnava river and on the shores of the Trnávka Reservoir.

History
The first written mention of Řečice is from 1279. It was the centre of a large manor belonging to Prague's bishops and, later, archbishops. Its next owners were Ladislaus the Posthumous, Trčka of Lípa family, and lords of Stráž. From 1612 until the abolishment of serfdom in 1850, it was owned by the lords of Říčany.

Sights
The Červená Řečice Castle was rebuilt in the Renaissance style in the 16th century. The castle complex is a valuable example of Czech Renaissance. The façade is decorated by sgraffiti. The original moat is partially preserved.

Twin towns – sister cities

Červená Řečice is twinned with:
 Kirchdorf, Switzerland

References

External links

Cities and towns in the Czech Republic
Populated places in Pelhřimov District